Rahmat Khali Canal, or Rahmatkhali river, is a canal that flows through Lakshmipur Sadar Upazila in Chittagong Division, Bangladesh.

Course 

See also 
 List of rivers in Bangladesh

References 

Water transport in Bangladesh
Rivers of Bangladesh
Rivers of Chittagong Division